Maretta Mitchell Taylor (January 25, 1935 – February 17, 2013) was an American educator and legislator.

Taylor received her bachelor's degree from Albany State University and her master's degree from Indiana University. She was a teacher and librarian. Taylor served as a Democrat in the Georgia House of Representatives 1990–2002. She died in Columbus, Georgia.

Notes

1935 births
2013 deaths
Albany State University alumni
Indiana University alumni
Democratic Party members of the Georgia House of Representatives
Women state legislators in Georgia (U.S. state)
21st-century American women